The Samoan tropical moist forests are a tropical moist broadleaf forest ecoregion in the Samoan Islands of the Pacific Ocean.

Approximately 30% of Samoa's biodiversity is endemic, found only in Samoa, with new species still being discovered including two new butterflies in 2009 and freshwater fish new to science. The country has more native species of ferns and butterflies than New Zealand, a country 85 times larger.

Geography
The Samoan Islands are in the central Pacific Ocean. They are volcanic in origin. The islands have a total area of 3,030 km². The largest islands in the group are Savai'i and Upolu. The islands are politically divided between Samoa, an independent country, and American Samoa, and unincorporated territory of the United States.

The islands are located south of the equator, and have a humid tropical climate. Rainfall exceeds 2000 mm annually.

Flora
Plant communities include lowland rain forest, which is the most extensive, with montane forests and cloud forests at higher elevations. There are smaller areas of montane scrub, Pandanus scrub, littoral (seashore) scrub, montane swamp forest, and summit scrub.

The area contains more than 100 volcanic craters including recent lava flows. The rainforest spans the inland region of the island and contains most of Samoa's endemic native species, many of which are threatened or near extinction.

Fauna

Endemic birds include the rare and unusual tooth-billed pigeon (Didinculus strigirostris), known locally as manumea and Samoa's national bird, and other birds such as the maomao honeyeater (Gymnomyza samoensis). The Samoan white-eye (Zosterops samoensis) and Samoan moorhen (Gallinula pacifica) are both endemic to Savai'i. The Samoan moorhen was last recorded in 1873 with possible sightings in 1984 at the upland forests and at Mount Silisili in 2003.

Conservation

Most of Samoa's land is under customary ownership, about 81% of which is governed at the local level by matai, the chiefly heads of families. Conservation projects therefore take place in partnership with matai, such as the lowland rainforest preserve in Falealupo village, at the western tip of Savai'i and Tafua village on the south east coast.

Some of the islands' plants are used for food, fiber, and traditional Samoan medicine (see Samoan plant names).

In 1994, Samoa ratified the international and legally binding treaty, the Convention on Biological Diversity to develop national strategies for conservation and sustainable use of biological diversity. By 2010 protected areas in the country covered 5% of land.

Protected areas include Cornwall National Park (24.94 km²), Lata National Park (49.92 km²), and Mauga o Salafai National Park (59.73 km²) on Savai'i, Lake Lanotoo National Park (4.7 km²) and O Le Pupu-Puʿe National Park (50.19 km²) on Upolu, and the National Park of American Samoa on Tutuila, Ofu, and Ta‘ū.

Gallery

See also
List of ecoregions in the United States (WWF)

External links
 Samoan tropical moist forests (World Wildlife Fund)

References

Biota of Samoa
Nature conservation in Samoa
Environment of Samoa
Environment of American Samoa
.
.

Oceanian ecoregions
Samoan Islands
Tropical and subtropical moist broadleaf forests
Ecoregions of American Samoa
Endemic Bird Areas